Pollard may refer to:

Places in the United States
 Pollard, Alabama, a town
 Pollard, Arkansas, a city
 Pollard, Kansas, an unincorporated community

People
 Pollard (surname), a list of people with the surname
 Pollard Hopewell (between 1786 and 1789 – 1813), midshipman in the United States Navy
 Charles Pollard Olivier (1884–1975), American astronomer
 James Pollard Espy (1785–1860), American meteorologist
 Jonathan Pollard (b. 1954), an American spy for Israel and former intelligence analyst
 Ngoia Pollard Napaltjarri (born c. 1948), Australian indigenous (Warlpiri people) artist
 Thomas Pollard Sampson (1875–1961), Australian architect

Flora and fauna
Pollard, an animal or a tree which has been polled (had its antlers or horns, or branches removed):
Pollard, a deer which has cast its antlers
Pollard or polled livestock, hornless livestock of normally-horned species
Pollard, a tree affected by pollarding, a method for shaping trees, cropping the branches above head-height
 Pollard, the European chub (Squalius cephalus), a freshwater fish of the family Cyprinidae

Mathematics
Several algorithms created by British mathematician John Pollard:
 Pollard's kangaroo algorithm
 Pollard's p − 1 algorithm
 Pollard's rho algorithm

Other uses
Pollard (coin), a medieval coin made in Europe in imitation of the English penny, outlawed under Edward I
 Pollard (novel), a novel by Laura Beatty
 Pollard, a mixture of fine bran and a small amount of flour
 Pollard railway station, former station in Victoria, Australia
 Pollard script, a writing system devised in 1905 for the A-Hmao language